Adelbert Nongrum is an Indian politician who was formerly the president of the Khun Hynniewtrep National Awakening Movement (KHNAM), a political party in Meghalaya, north-eastern India. Representing North Shillong constituency, he was the party's only representative in the Meghalaya Legislative Assembly following the 2018 election.

In July 2022, Nongrum indicated an intention to join the Voice of the People Party and in October stated that he planned to contest the 2023 Meghalaya Legislative Assembly election for the party. On 12 January 2023, Nongrum resigned from the Assembly and repeated his intention to contest the 2023 election as a VPP candidate.

References 

Living people
Meghalaya MLAs 2018–2023
Meghalaya politicians
People from Meghalaya
Year of birth missing (living people)